Mike Andrade (born March 10, 1980) is an American politician serving as a member of the Indiana House of Representatives from the 12th district. He assumed office on November 4, 2020.

Background 
Andrade was raised in the Pilsen neighborhood of Chicago and then moved to Hammond, Indiana as a young adult. Andrade owns and operates a real estate investment firm. In November 2020, Andrade was elected to the Indiana House of Representatives for the 12 district, succeeding Mara Candelaria Reardon.

References 

Living people
1980 births
Hispanic and Latino American state legislators
Democratic Party members of the Indiana House of Representatives
Politicians from Chicago
People from Hammond, Indiana